Ramphotyphlops suluensis, also known as the Sulu Islands worm snake, is a species of blind snake that is endemic to the Philippines. The specific epithet suluensis refers to the type locality.

Behaviour 
The species is oviparous.

Distribution and habitat 
The type locality is Bubuan Island in the Tapian group of the Sulu Archipelago.

References 

suluensis
Snakes of Asia
Reptiles of the Philippines
Endemic fauna of the Philippines
Fauna of Sulu
Taxa named by Edward Harrison Taylor
Reptiles described in 1918